Rodney Seymour Wallace (born 2 October 1969) is an English former professional footballer.

A striker, Wallace started his football career at Southampton in 1987, playing 128 league games and scoring 45 goals. This form earned him a transfer to Leeds United where he won the First Division championship.

After spending seven years at Leeds, Rangers signed him on a Bosman transfer in 1998. At Rangers, he scored 41 league goals and was part of a squad that won five domestic trophies in his first two seasons. In 2001, he signed for Bolton Wanderers on a free transfer, staying for one season, and then spent two seasons with Gillingham, before retiring from professional football.

Playing career

Southampton

Wallace was born in Lewisham and signed for Southampton as an apprentice in 1986 along with his twin brother Ray. Their older brother, Danny had already become an established member of the Southampton first team.

On 22 October 1988, his two brothers Danny and Ray lined up alongside him in the Southampton team in a match at The Dell against Sheffield Wednesday; this was the first time three brothers had played in the same team in English professional top-flight football. In his best season at Southampton, 1989–90, he scored 21 goals in all competitions. The previous season also saw his goal tally reach double figures, as did the season after, as he formed an exciting young strikeforce with Alan Shearer and Matthew Le Tissier, which soon attracted interest from a number of bigger clubs.

The following year he played against Bulgaria, Republic of Ireland and United States for the England under-21 team.

Leeds United
Fellow top-flight team Leeds United signed him for £1.6 million in the summer of 1991, and he helped them win the First Division championship and Charity Shield competition a year later.

He became an integral part of the Leeds squad for the next seven years and was found often playing as an out-and-out striker or in a more wide position. In September 1992, Wallace was called up to the senior England squad for a friendly against Spain, but had to pull out because of injury. He was never called up for international duty again.

He scored a hat-trick for Leeds on the last day of the 1992–93 season in a 3–3 draw at Coventry City.

Wallace won the 1993–94 Goal of the Season competition with a mazy dribble against Tottenham Hotspur in a Premier League game on 17 April 1994. His brother, Danny, had won the same award ten seasons earlier, making them the first and, to date, only brothers to win the award. Leeds finished fifth at the end of that season, repeating this finish in 1995 and 1998. Wallace's contract with the Elland Road club was due to expire in the summer of 1998 and this resulted in a Bosman transfer to Scottish club Rangers.

Rangers
In Scotland he won five medals to add to the silverware won during his time in England. In his first season, he won the domestic treble, finishing as top scorer with 27 goals and scoring the winning goal in the 1999 Scottish cup final win over Celtic, the first cup final to be played at the fully renovated Hampden Park. The following season he was part of the squad that won the league and cup double. In total he made 122 appearances and scored 56 goals.

Bolton Wanderers
In 2001, he returned to English football on a free transfer to link up with newly promoted Bolton Wanderers of the Premier League. He scored on his début away to Blackburn Rovers at Ewood Park and managed to net further goals against Tottenham and Blackburn again. He also scored once in the League Cup against Nottingham Forest. Wallace successfully helped Bolton avoid relegation, but moved on after rejecting a new one-year contract.

Gillingham

In June 2002 he joined Gillingham on a two-year contract and managed to score 12 goals in his first full season at the Priestfield Stadium. His time with the Gills was blighted by a succession of injuries and at the end of the 2003–04 season he announced his retirement from professional football. The summer of 2004 saw him return to Southampton in a one-off benefit game organised for elder brother Danny who has been diagnosed with the condition Multiple sclerosis.

Coaching career
In January 2008, he was appointed as assistant manager of Kingstonian's under 18 side, before joining Molesey for season 2010–11. Wallace joined Epsom & Ewell as a reserve team coach in October 2011.

Career statistics

Honours
Leeds United
 First Division: 1991–92
 FA Charity Shield: 1992

Rangers
Scottish Premier League:  1998–99, 1999–2000
Scottish Cup:  1998–99, 1999–2000
Scottish League Cup: 1998–99

References

External links
 

1969 births
Living people
Black British sportsmen
Footballers from Lewisham
English footballers
England B international footballers
England under-21 international footballers
Southampton F.C. players
Leeds United F.C. players
Rangers F.C. players
Bolton Wanderers F.C. players
Gillingham F.C. players
Premier League players
Scottish Premier League players
Association football forwards
English twins
Twin sportspeople